Pseudagrostistachys is a plant genus of the family Euphorbiaceae first described as a genus in 1912. It is native to tropical Africa.

Species
 Pseudagrostistachys africana (Müll.Arg.) Pax & K.Hoffm. - Chana, Nigeria, Congo-Brazzaville, Equatorial Guinea, Zaire, São Tomé and Príncipe 
 Pseudagrostistachys ugandensis (Hutch.) Pax & K.Hoffm. - Uganda, Tanzania, Zaire, Zambia

References

Agrostistachydeae
Euphorbiaceae genera
Flora of Africa